Rayagiri is a panchayat town in Tenkasi district in the Indian state of Tamil Nadu.

Population 
 India census, Rayagiri had a population 10,855. Males constitute 52% of the population and females 48%. Rayagiri has an average literacy rate of 61%, higher than the national average of 59.5%: male literacy is 72% and female literacy is 50%. In Rayagiri, 11% of the population is under 6 years of age.

Location 
Rayagiri is exactly 121 km from Madurai towards south and 86 km from Tirunelveli towards north and 3 km away from Madurai - chengottai Highway.

Schools 
In Rayagiri, there are six elementary schools, one girls high school, one higher secondary school and two private matriculation schools are available.

Adjacent communities 
The nearest cities to Rayagiri are Rajapalayam, Puliyangudi and Sankaran Kovil.

References 

Cities and towns in Tirunelveli district